Sir Charles Marshall (1788 – 5 February 1873) was the sixth Chief Justice of Ceylon.

Marshall was the only son of Sergeant Marshall, a lawyer, and was educated at Westminster School. He matriculated at Jesus College, Cambridge in 1806, graduating B.A. in 1810, and M.A. in 1814. He was called to the Bar at the Inner Temple in 1815.

Marshall was knighted in 1832 and appointed Chief Justice of Ceylon on 18 February 1833, succeeding Richard Ottley. In 1835 he fought a duel with Sir John Wilson, in command of British troops in Ceylon, which took place in the Cinnamon Gardens, Colombo, once a plantation. He held the position until his resignation on 3 March 1836,  when he was succeeded by William Norris.

Marshall produced the first book on Sri Lankan Law. He also published Term Reports Common Pleas and Marshall on Insurance.

He died at his London home in 1873. He had married Mary, the widow of John Cox.

References

1788 births
1873 deaths
Lawyers from London
People educated at Westminster School, London
Alumni of Jesus College, Cambridge
English barristers
Chief Justices of British Ceylon
20th-century Sri Lankan people
19th-century Sri Lankan people
Sri Lankan people of British descent
British expatriates in Sri Lanka
19th-century British people
Knights Bachelor
19th-century English lawyers